Alvin Alvarez (born November 5, 1989) is an actor who is best known for his role as Larry Garcia on the show, The Brothers Garcia.

Family
Alvarez has one sister who is two years older than him, named Amy Alvarez. The character of Larry Garcia is the youngest of 3 siblings on the show, The Brothers Garcia, and back in 2000, Alvarez disclosed to the publication company, Variety, that he relates to him on many different levels. He stated: “Larry is pretty much like me, I have an older sister. My mom is very protective, and he’s the youngest of the family, just like me. I can just be myself, because that’s what it’s about. I don’t need to act much.”

Career
Alvarez is most widely known for his role as Larry Garcia on The Brothers Garcia, although previously he had made appearances on other shows such as ER, The Bernie Mac Show, and Beverly Hills, 90210.

Television and movies

Awards and nominations

References

Further reading
Martinez, Julio (July 23, 2000). LOS GARCIA: 'The Brothers Garcia' es la primera serie de comedia de television creada, producida y con un elenco estelar totalmente latino, que estrenara en Nickelodeon. La Opinión. 74(312). p. 1F.

American male actors of Mexican descent
1989 births
Living people
American male actors